Jonathan Silas Zwingina is a Nigerian politician who was elected Senator for the Adamawa South constituency of Adamawa State, Nigeria at the start of the Nigerian Fourth Republic, running on the People's Democratic Party (PDP) platform. He took office on 29 May 1999.
He was reelected in April 2003, again on the PDP platform.
After taking his seat in the Senate in June 1999, he was appointed to committees on Works & Housing (chairman), Establishment, Internal Affairs, Information, Special Projects, Privatization and Economic Affairs.
Zwingina's palatial residence in Abuja was demolished in February 2007, allegedly on the orders of Nasir el-Rufai, the Federal Capital Territory Minister.

He is the current Chairman board of trustees of Save Democracy Group Africa.

References

Living people
People from Adamawa State
Peoples Democratic Party members of the Senate (Nigeria)
20th-century Nigerian politicians
21st-century Nigerian politicians
Year of birth missing (living people)